is a railway station  in the city of Hachinohe, Aomori Prefecture, Japan, operated by East Japan Railway Company (JR East).

Lines
Mutsuminato Station is served by the Hachinohe Line, and is 9.0 kilometers from the starting point of the line at Hachinohe Station.

Station layout
The station has one ground-level island platform serving two tracks, with an elevated station building. The station has a Midori no Madoguchi ticket office in addition to automated ticket machines.

Platforms

History
Mutsuminato Station opened on July 11, 1926 as a station on the Japanese Government Railways (JGR). A freight spur line to nearby Iwaki Cement (now part of Sumitomo Cement) was opened in 1927; the spur line was closed in 1986. With the privatization of the Japanese National Railways (JNR, the post-war successor to the JGR) on April 1, 1987, the station came under the operational control of JR East.

Passenger statistics
In fiscal 2018, the station was used by an average of 134 passengers daily (boarding passengers only).

Surrounding area
Port of Hachinohe

See also
 List of Railway Stations in Japan

References

External links

  

Railway stations in Aomori Prefecture
Railway stations in Japan opened in 1926
Hachinohe Line
Hachinohe
Stations of East Japan Railway Company